The 2012–13 Adelaide United FC season was the club's eighth A-League season. It includes the 2012–13 A-League season as well as any other competitions of the 2012–13 football season, including the 2012 AFC Champions League. Adelaide United will compete in the continental competition for the fourth time, progressing past the Group Stage by topping the group for the third time, thus making the club the most successful Australian club in Asia.

Adelaide United's 2012–13 season was John Kosmina's first full season as permanent coach since being appointed in a caretaker role from Rini Coolen in December 2011. The season was also Kosmina's first in charge at Adelaide since the 2006–7 season. The offseason and preseason saw the signings of Fábio Ferreira from Sydney-based Dulwich Hill FC, Marcelo Carrusca, Daniel Bowles and Jake Barker-Daish. The club begin a new deal with kit supplier Kappa and local solar panel firm Unleash Solar, who joined the club as front-of-kit sponsor.

The club's home and away season began away to Newcastle Jets on 7 October 2012 just four days after being eliminated from the 2012 Asian Champions League. The match saw Adelaide win 2–0, with goals from Dario Vidosic and Iain Ramsay, as well as the debuts of Ferreira, Carrusca, Bowles and Barker-Daish for Adelaide. Adelaide followed this up a week later with a 1–0 win over Western Sydney Wanderers FC in their first away trip, the lone goal to Neumann, thus dealing Western Sydney their first loss and first goal conceded. In Round 3 Adelaide played Melbourne Victory at Etihad Stadium on 19 October. Despite gaining a lead early in the second half through a Vidosic penalty, Melbourne Victory scored two goals for their first win of the season, and Adelaide's first loss.

Adelaide United responded to the loss in kind the following round at home, coming from a goal down to defeat Wellington Phoenix 3–1 in Cássio's 100th A-League match. Aptly, he scored, as did Neumann. In Round 5 Adelaide travelled to Brisbane, continuing their good form at Suncorp Stadium. Dario Vidosic scored from a free kick in just the third minute. Adelaide successfully defended the lead and won the match 1–0, with much notable praise heaped on goalkeeper and captain Eugene Galekovic. Adelaide returned home for a Remembrance Day match against Perth Glory. Perth scored the opening goal, but Adelaide equalised through Vidosic. The match ended 1–1. A week later Adelaide recorded another 1–0 success, this time over Melbourne Heart. Again, the lone scorer was Neumann.

By this point Adelaide had earned its position at the top of the A-League ladder, with five wins, one draw and just one loss. A trip to Sydney at Allianz Stadium on 23 November saw a sixth win against Sydney FC. Ferreira scored his first goal for the club before Yairo Yau equalised. Vidosic struck home the winner in the 88th minute, Adelaide winning 2–1 and continuing Sydney FC's poor form. United's next match was at Bluetongue Stadium against Central Coast Mariners. Eugene Galekovic and Dario Vidosic had been selected to compete for Australia in the East Asian Cup, and therefore did not play the match. However, Vidosic gained an injury and consequently remained in Australia, though he missed the match. Paul Izzo made his debut in place of Eugene Galekovic, becoming the 100th-ever player to make an appearance for Adelaide United. Adelaide gained the lead through Bruce Djite in the 17th minute and led at half-time, but the goal was not enough and Central Coast scored two goals in the second half to hand Adelaide just its second loss in eight games.

A week later Adelaide hosted Melbourne Victory on 7 December. Over 14,000 fans attended, and it proved to be one of the most-watched matches of the season. The match indirectly attracted controversy when reports surfaced of apparent massive, multimillion-dollar bets being placed on the game. Adelaide defeated Melbourne Victory 4–2. Evan Kostopoulos scored his first ever A-League goals, netting a brace, with Ferriera and Carrusca adding to Adelaide's tally. Carrusca scored an astonishing effort, striking the ball with his first touch on the right flank it curved to the inside left of the goal, around Melbourne Victory goalkeeper Nathan Coe. A week later Adelaide notched an eighth win for the season, again defeating Wellington Phoenix 3–1, with a brace to Carrusca and a goal by Ferreira. The final action of the match saw Eugene Galekovic save a penalty, and then athletically save the rebound.

Cameron Watson, Bruce Djite, Cassio, Jeronimo Neumann and Fabio Ferreira each extended their contracts for a further two years. Round 12 saw Adelaide make a first-ever trip to Parramatta Stadium on 21 December. Western Sydney Wanderers had previously been somewhat scrutinised for a lack of goalscoring form, but on this occasion defeated Adelaide 6–1. On Boxing Day Adelaide hosted Brisbane Roar, losing 1–0. The match was Adelaide's first home loss and first match without scoring in the season. United rebounded on New Year's Eve, hosting Sydney FC and winning 3–0. Vidosic scored a brace with Ramsay netting the final goal. United followed this with a 0–0 draw in hot, dry conditions at Newcastle. On 11 January 2013, Adelaide United hosted Perth Glory. Some tension had been brewing between supporters and stadium security, as well as with the club itself. Both supporter groups staged a silent protest, with the issue being given significant media attention on internet and radio, citing disconnect with the club and heavy-handedness by security staff. At the conclusion of the protest, the stadium erupted to rapturous applause. Adelaide went on to defeat Perth 3–2.

Adelaide United lost its next three matches. Firstly was a 2–0 loss away to Melbourne Heart, and subsequently a 3–1 loss away to Central Coast Mariners (despite, again, gaining the lead before half-time). John Kosmina had expressed his desire to the club for a two-year extension to his contract, and rumours publicly emerged of assistant coach Michael Valkanis being offered a contract extension, but not Kosmina. Kosmina resigned as head coach shortly thereafter. Valkanis was appointed as interim coach until the end of the season, with former Adelaide City FC player Sergio Melta being appointed as his assistant. Valkanis' first match in charge saw Adelaide lose 2–4 at home to Western Sydney, but a week later delivered a resounding 1–0 win over Melbourne Victory, Jeronimo Neumann once more the lone goalscorer. The triumph ended Victory's run of form, who subsequently struggled for positive results for the remainder of the season.

Unleash Solar collapsed and went into administration, eventually dissolving. This left the club with no front-of-shirt sponsor. Adelaide announced the signing of Tomi Jurić on a short-term deal until the conclusion of the season. Adelaide won just one of its remaining matches, a 2–0 away win over Melbourne Heart. Finishing the season in fourth place, United hosted Brisbane Roar in an elimination final, but lost 1–2, thereby ending Adelaide's season.

Season overview
It was announced on 1 December 2011 that as part of the AFC Champions League review conducted earlier in the year, Australia would be granted an extra play-off slot for the 2012 edition of the competition. Adelaide United placed 3rd in the 2010–11 A-League season and thus gained entry into the Play-off stage of the competition, alongside Champions Brisbane Roar and Runners-Up Central Coast Mariners who qualified directly into the Group Stage. Due to the Chinese and Indonesian clubs' withdrawal from the play-offs, Adelaide were fortunate enough to be drawn directly into the Group Stage of the 2012 AFC Champions League without the need to progress through the preliminary stages. The club was drawn into Group E alongside former opponents, Gamba Osaka, Bunyodkor and Pohang Steelers.

February
In an unprecedented turn of events, the Court of Arbitration for Sport ruled in favour of rebel Indonesian club Persipura Jayapura’s appeal for inclusion in the competition and revoked Adelaide's direct entry into the group stage and a play-off match was reinstated to determine the club to progress to Group E.

Adelaide United hosted the Indonesian club on 16 February, and convincingly won the game 3–0, therefore removing all doubt of the club's right to enter the continental competition for the Australian club record 4th time.

March
On 6 March, Adelaide United travelled to Tashkent, Uzbekistan for Match Day 1 of the Champions League, and returned with a 2–1 win in sub-zero conditions against reigning Uzbek champions, Bunyodkor.

Former Asian champions, Gamba Osaka made the trip to Hindmarsh Stadium for Match Day 2 on 20 March. Adelaide United came out the victors with a first half brace from Daniel Mullen being the difference.

On the back of the club's win over Gamba Osaka, interim head coach John Kosmina was signed on for a further season as the club's manager on 22 March.

April
Match Day 3 saw Adelaide United travel to the home of Pohang Steelers on 3 April, where a rare defensive error from Adelaide captain and goalkeeper Eugene Galeković gifted the home side the sole goal of the contest, and the three points.

The return leg was played in Adelaide two weeks later, where again a lone goal decided the tie. On 18 April, Adelaide United kept its second clean sheet of the AFC Champions League group stage when Bruce Djite scored in the 90th minute to send the Australian club clear at the top of Group E.

July
The club announced a new 2-year partnership with kit supplier Kappa on 16 July, after it dissolved its previous contract with Erreà after the company's failure to deliver products to the club's expectations.

August
Without Coopers Brewery as primary major sponsor, Adelaide United were forced into securing an alternative major sponsor. On 29 August, the club announced a one-year front-of-shirt sponsorship partnership with Unleash Solar worth a reported $250,000.

Players

Squad information

From the youth system

Players in / out

Re-signed

In (Pre-season)

In (Mid-season)

Out (Pre-season)

Out (Mid-season)

Player statistics

Squad stats

Delisted players

Disciplinary records
Includes all competitive matches. The list is sorted by shirt number.

Scorers

AFC Champions League

A-League

Club

Coaching staff

Managerial Changes

Attendance at home games

Competitions

Overall

Pre-season

A-League

League table

Results summary

Results by round

Matches

Finals

References

External links
 Official website

2012-13
2012–13 A-League season by team